Agustín García-Gasco y Vicente (12 February 1931 – 1 May 2011) was a Spanish Cardinal of the Catholic Church. He served as Archbishop of Valencia from 1992 to 2009, and was elevated to the cardinalate in 2007.

Biography
Born in Corral de Almaguer, García-Gasco y Vicente entered the seminary of Madrid-Alcalá in 1944 and was ordained a priest on 26 May 1956 by Leopoldo Eijo y Garay, bishop of Madrid-Alcalá, patriarch of the Western Indies. He served as pastor in Villamanta and Episcopal Delegate of Diocesan Cáritas. He was also a member of Diocesan Pastoral Junta, 1963–1966. Pastor of the parish of Santísimo Cristo del Amor, Madrid, in 1964. In 1966, he was named prefect of theologians and professor of the Seminary of Madrid. In 1970, pastor of the parish Santiago y San Juan Bautista, Madrid. Professor of religion of U.N.E.D. (Universidad Nacional de Educación a Distancia) and diocesan delegate of the clergy, 1973. In 1977, he was named episcopal vicar of the III Viacariate of Madrid. In 1979, he was designated professor of Instituto Teolsgico "San Damaso"; and in 1982, president of Institución Arzobispo Claret.

In 1985 he was made auxiliary bishop of Madrid, Spain and Titular bishop of Nona. On 24 July 1992 he became Archbishop of Valencia. He retired as Archbishop of Valencia on 8 January 2009.

On 17 October 2007, Pope Benedict XVI announced that he would make Archbishop García-Gasco y Vicente a Cardinal. García-Gasco y Vicente was created Cardinal-Priest of San Marcello in the consistory at St. Peter's Basilica on 24 November 2007. He lost his right to voting in papal conclave on 12 February 2011, when he turned 80. He died because of a heart attack on 1 May 2011, in Rome, day of the Beatification of Pope John Paul II. In November his official portrait was unveiled by the archdiocese of Valencia.

See also

Notes

Sources 
  Biography on the Valencia Archdiocese web site
  Data on www.catholic-hierarchy.org web site, at the page 
  Data on www.gcatholic.org web site, at the page 
  Data on The Cardinals of the Holy Roman Church web site, at the page 

1931 births
2011 deaths
Archbishops of Valencia
21st-century Spanish cardinals
Cardinals created by Pope Benedict XVI
20th-century Roman Catholic archbishops in Spain